The  is an annual knockout cup competition in Italian football organized by the FIGC until the 2009–10 season and the Lega Serie A ever since.

History
The beginning of the tournament was turbulent, due to the complexity of the participation of the teams in the tournament, since its inception in 1921, the Italian championship was divided into two groups. On the one hand the CCI Championship (Italian Football Confederation) and on the other the FIGC championship (Italian Football Federation). These two championships were not organized between them, so they could not manage the dates that allowed the normal course of the tournament. The tournament's first edition held in 1922 was won by F.C. Vado. The second edition, scheduled in the 1926–27 season, was cancelled during the round of 32. The third edition was not held until 1935–36. The events of World War II interrupted the tournament after the 1942–43 season, and it did not resume again until 1958. Since then, it has been played annually or seasonally.

Juventus is the competition's most successful club with fourteen wins, followed by Roma with nine. Juventus has contested the most finals with twenty, followed by Roma with seventeen finals. The holder can wear a cockade of Italy (Italian: coccarda), akin to the roundels that appear on military aircraft.  The winner automatically qualifies for both the UEFA Europa League group stage and the Supercoppa Italiana the following year.

Format

The competition is a knockout tournament with pairings for each round made in advance; the draw for the whole competition is made before a ball is kicked. Each tie is played as a single leg, except a two-legged semi-final stage. If a match is drawn, extra time is played. In the event of a draw after 120 Minutes, a penalty shoot-out is contested. As well as being presented with the trophy, the winning team also qualifies for the UEFA Europa League (formerly the UEFA Cup). If the winners have already qualified for the UEFA Champions League via the Serie A, or are not entitled to play in UEFA competitions for any reason, the place goes to the next highest placed team in the league table.

There are a total of seven rounds in the competition. The competition begins in August with the preliminary round and is contested only by the eight lowest-ranked clubs. Clubs playing in Serie B join in during the first round with the 12 lowest-ranked teams in Serie A based on the previous league season's positions (unless they are to compete in European competition that year) begin the competition in the first round before August is over. The remaining eight Serie A teams join the competition in the third round in January, at which point 16 teams remain. The round of 16, the quarter-finals and the first leg of the semi-finals are then played in quick succession after the fourth round and the second leg of the semi-finals is played a couple of months later – in April – before the final in May. The two-legged final was eliminated for the 2007–08 edition and a single-match final is now played at the Stadio Olimpico in Rome.

Winners by year

Performance by club

Trophies

Notes
 The 1922 tournament was contested only by minor teams, the biggest clubs having left the FIGC to form a private league of their own.
 Although 75 tournaments have been contested, only 74 cups have been assigned. The 1926–27 tournament was cancelled in the round of 32.

Finals

In bold are the winners of the finals.

 Notes
 From 1968 to 1971, FIGC introduced a final group instead of semi-finals and finals. For statistical equity, only champions and runners-up of those groups are counted as finalists.

Performance by player

Top appearances

Top goalscorers

Most titles 
Gianluigi Buffon and Roberto Mancini (6)

Broadcasting
This is a list of television broadcasters and streaming television providers which provide coverage of the Coppa Italia, as well as the Supercoppa Italiana and maybe exclude the Serie A matches (depending on broadcasting rights in selected regions).

2021–2024

Italy 
The Supercoppa Italiana and the Coppa Italia are currently aired by Mediaset from the current season onwards. Previously, the tournament was aired by the national public broadcaster RAI until the 2020–21 season.

International

References

External links

  (in English)
 Italy – List of Cup Finals (with links to full results) from RSSSF
 Coppa Italia Roll Of Honour
 Coppa Italia matches by season
 Current-season Coppa Italia schedule by SofaScore

 
Recurring sporting events established in 1922
1
Italy
1922 establishments in Italy
Professional sports leagues in Italy